Gogolice may refer to the following places:
Gogolice, Greater Poland Voivodeship (west-central Poland)
Gogolice, Gryfino County in West Pomeranian Voivodeship (north-west Poland)
Gogolice, Kamień County in West Pomeranian Voivodeship (north-west Poland)